This is a list of 171 species in Lispe, a genus of house flies, etc. in the family Muscidae.

Lispe species

Lispe albicorpus Shinonaga & Kano, 1989
Lispe albifacies Malloch, 1929
Lispe albimacula (Malloch, 1923)
Lispe albimaculata Stein, 1910
Lispe albitarsis (Stein, 1898)
Lispe albitarsus Stein, 1901
Lispe alpinicola Zhong, Wu & Fan, 1981
Lispe ambigua Stein, 1913
Lispe andrewi Paterson, 1953
Lispe angustipalpis (Stein, 1920)
Lispe antennata (Aldrich, 1913)
Lispe apicalis Mik, 1869
Lispe appendibacula Xue & Zhang, 2005
Lispe approximata Huckett, 1966
Lispe aquamarina Shinonaga & Kano, 1983
Lispe argentea Snyder, 1954
Lispe argenteiceps Ma & Mou, 1992
Lispe argenteifacies Grimshaw, 1901
Lispe armata Malloch, 1925
Lispe armeniaca Canzoneri & Meneghini, 1972
Lispe assimilis Wiedemann, 1824
Lispe atrifrontata (Malloch, 1922)
Lispe aurocochlearia Séguy, 1950
Lispe bahama Snyder, 1958
Lispe barbipes Stein, 1908
Lispe bengalensis (Robineau-Desvoidy, 1830)
Lispe bimaculata Walker, 1859
Lispe binotata (Becker, 1914)
Lispe bipunctata Séguy, 1938
Lispe biseta Stein, 1913
Lispe bivittata Stein, 1909
Lispe boninensis Snyder, 1965
Lispe brevipes (Aldrich, 1913)
Lispe brunnicosa (Becker, 1904)
Lispe caesia Meigen, 1826
Lispe cana (Walker, 1849)
Lispe canadensis Snyder, 1954
Lispe cancellata Canzoneri & Meneghini, 1966
Lispe candicans Kowarz, 1892
Lispe capensis Zielke, 1971
Lispe chui Shinonaga & Kano, 1989
Lispe cilitarsis Loew, 1856
Lispe cinifera (Becker, 1904)
Lispe consanguinea Loew, 1858
Lispe cotidiana Snyder, 1954
Lispe cyrtoneurina Stein, 1900
Lispe desertorum Huckett, 1966
Lispe desjardinsii Macquart, 1851
Lispe dichaeta Stein, 1913
Lispe eidsvoldica Malloch, 1925
Lispe elegantissima (Stackelberg, 1937)
Lispe elkantarae (Becker, 1907)
Lispe erratica (Malloch, 1932)
Lispe ezensis Shinonaga & Kano, 1983
Lispe flavicincta Loew, 1847
Lispe flavicornis (Stein, 1909)
Lispe flavinervis (Becker, 1904)
Lispe flavipes Stein, 1913
Lispe frigida Erichson, 1851
Lispe frontalis Zielke, 1972
Lispe fuscipalpis Malloch, 1929
Lispe fuscipes (Ringdahl, 1930)
Lispe geniseta Stein, 1909
Lispe glabra Wiedemann, 1824
Lispe halophora (Becker, 1903)
Lispe hamanae Hori & Kurahashi, 1966
Lispe hebeiensis Ma & Tian, 1993
Lispe hirsutipes Mou, 1992
Lispe hispida Walker, 1849
Lispe hydromyzina (Fallén, 1825)
Lispe incerta (Malloch, 1925)
Lispe irvingi Curran, 1937
Lispe isolata Malloch, 1929
Lispe jamesi Snyder, 1954
Lispe johnsoni (Aldrich, 1913)
Lispe keiseri Zielke, 1972
Lispe kowarzi Becker, 1903
Lispe lanceoseta Wang & Fan, 1981
Lispe lanzarotensis Baez, 1978
Lispe latana Snyder, 1949
Lispe leucocephala Loew, 1856
Lispe leucospila (Wiedemann, 1830)
Lispe leucosticta Stein, 1918
Lispe levis Stein, 1911
Lispe lisarba Snyder, 1949
Lispe litorea (Fallén, 1825)
Lispe loewi Ringdahl, 1922
Lispe longicollis Meigen, 1826
Lispe lowei (Ringdahl, 1922)
Lispe maculata Stein, 1913
Lispe madagascariensis Zielke, 1972
Lispe manicata Wiedemann, 1830
Lispe mapaoensis Paterson, 1953
Lispe marina (Becker, 1913)
Lispe maroccana Canzoneri & Meneghini, 1966
Lispe martirei Vikhrev, 2014
Lispe melaleuca Loew, 1847
Lispe metatarsalis Thomson, 1869
Lispe metatarsata Stein, 1900
Lispe microchaeta (Séguy, 1940)
Lispe microptera Séguy, 1937
Lispe miochaeta Speiser, 1910
Lispe mirabilis (Stein, 1918)
Lispe modesta Stein, 1913
Lispe monochaita Mou & Ma, 1992
Lispe nana Macquart, 1835
Lispe nasoni (Stein, 1898)
Lispe neimongola Tian & Ma, 2000
Lispe neo Malloch, 1922
Lispe neouliginosa Snyder, 1954
Lispe nigrimana (Malloch, 1923)
Lispe nivalis Wiedemann, 1830
Lispe niveimaculata Stein, 1906
Lispe nuba Wiedemann, 1830
Lispe nubilipennis Loew, 1873
Lispe nudifacies Snyder, 1954
Lispe orientalis Wiedemann, 1824
Lispe pacifica Shinonaga & Pont, 1992
Lispe palawanensis Shinonaga & Kano, 1989
Lispe palposa (Walker, 1849)
Lispe paraneo Zielke, 1972
Lispe paraspila Zielke, 1972
Lispe patellata (Aldrich, 1913)
Lispe patellitarsis (Becker, 1914)
Lispe pectinipes Becker, 1903
Lispe pennitarsis Stein, 1918
Lispe persica (Becker, 1904)
Lispe polita (Coquillett, 1904)
Lispe ponti Hardy, 1981
Lispe probohemica (Speiser, 1914)
Lispe pumila (Wiedemann, 1824)
Lispe pygmaea (Fallén, 1825)
Lispe quaerens (Villeneuve, 1936)
Lispe rigida (Becker, 1903)
Lispe rufitibialis Macquart, 1843
Lispe salina (Aldrich, 1913)
Lispe scalaris Loew, 1847
Lispe septentrionalis Xue & Zhang, 2005
Lispe sericipalpis (Stein, 1904)
Lispe serotina Wulp, 1896
Lispe setuligera Stein, 1911
Lispe sexnotata Macquart, 1843
Lispe siamensis Shinonaga & Kano, 1989
Lispe silvai Paterson, 1953
Lispe simonyii (Becker, 1910)
Lispe sineseta Zielke, 1971
Lispe sinica Hennig, 1960
Lispe sociabilis Loew, 1862
Lispe songensis Zielke, 1970
Lispe sordida (Aldrich, 1913)
Lispe stuckenbergi Zielke, 1970
Lispe subbivittata Mou, 1992
Lispe superciliosa Loew, 1861
Lispe surda Curran, 1937
Lispe sydneyensis Schiner, 1868
Lispe tarsocilica Xue & Zhang, 2005
Lispe tentaculata (De Geer, 1776)
Lispe terastigma Schiner, 1868
Lispe tienmuensis Fan, 1974
Lispe tuberculitarsis Stein, 1913
Lispe uliginosa (Fallén, 1825)
Lispe unicolor (Brullé, 1833)
Lispe uniseta Malloch, 1922
Lispe vilis Stein, 1911
Lispe vittipennis Thomson, 1869
Lispe weschei Malloch, 1922
Lispe wittei Paterson, 1956
Lispe xanthophleba Stein, 1950
Lispe xenochaeta Malloch, 1923
Lispe zumpti Paterson, 1953

References

Lispe